Diego Martin North/East is a parliamentary electoral district in Trinidad and Tobago in the north-west of Trinidad. It has been represented since the 2007 general election by Colm Imbert of the People's National Movement (PNM).

Constituency profile 
The constituency was created prior to the 2007 general election from the former constituency of Diego Martin East. It borders the constituencies of Diego Martin West, Diego Martin Central, St. Ann's East, Port of Spain North/St. Ann's West, and Port of Spain South. The main towns are Dibe and Maraval. It had an electorate of 17,145 as of 2015.

Members of Parliament 
This constituency has elected the following members of the House of Representatives of Trinidad and Tobago:

Election results

Elections in the 2020s

Elections in the 2010s

References 

Constituencies of the Parliament of Trinidad and Tobago